Figure skating was first included at the Southeast Asian Games in 2017. The event is held every two years. Medals are awarded in senior men's and ladies' singles. Skaters from five countries – Indonesia, Malaysia, the Philippines, Singapore, and Thailand – have won medals at the event.

Medalists

Men

Ladies

References